James Harvey Bennett (born August 11, 1877) was an American sailor serving in the United States Navy during the Spanish–American War who received the Medal of Honor for bravery.

Biography
Bennett was born August 11, 1877, in New York City, New York.

Medal of Honor citation
Rank and organization: Chief Boatswain's Mate, U.S. Navy. Born: 11 August 1877, New York, N.Y. Accredited to: New York. G.O. No.: 521, 7 July 1899.

Citation:

On board the U.S.S. Marblehead during the cutting of the cable leading from Cienfuegos, Cuba, 11 May 1898. Facing the heavy fire of the enemy, Bennett set an example of extraordinary bravery and coolness throughout this action.

See also

List of Medal of Honor recipients for the Spanish–American War

References

1877 births
Year of death missing
United States Navy Medal of Honor recipients
United States Navy sailors
Military personnel from New York City
American military personnel of the Spanish–American War
Spanish–American War recipients of the Medal of Honor